One Manhattan West is a 67-story office skyscraper  in the Manhattan West development. It was completed in 2019 and will serve as the second tower completed in the development after 3 Manhattan West.

History
In July 2018, Wells Fargo provided a $530 million construction loan for the project. The structure topped out in August 2018, and officially opened on October 30, 2019.

In December 2021, Blackstone began negotiations to acquire 49% of the building from Brookfield Asset Management for approximately US$1.40 billion.

Architecture
The building is 67-stories,  and anticipated to achieve LEED Gold certification.

The tower is rectangular in plan. The north, south and west faces rise vertically up from the ground, while the east face bows out until the 16th floor and then tapers in uniformly to the roof.

Structural design
The structural system of the tower is composed of a central reinforced concrete core and a perimeter steel moment frame. Part of the tower overhangs the below ground train tracks leading into Penn Station. In order to avoid the tracks, the perimeter columns on the south, north, and east sides do not come down to ground level, but are transferred to the core above the building's lobby.

Tenants
As of September 2019, the building was 86% leased:
 Floors 6-22, 48: Ernst & Young
 Floors 23-27: National Hockey League
 Floors 28-46: Skadden, Arps, Slate, Meagher & Flom LLP
 Floors 50-51: McKool Smith
 Floor 56: Pharo Management
 Floor 57: Wiz
 Floors 59-67: Accenture

References

Skyscraper office buildings in Manhattan
Twin towers
Brookfield Properties buildings
Hudson Yards, Manhattan
Skidmore, Owings & Merrill buildings
Chelsea, Manhattan
Office buildings completed in 2019